Anastasia at This Address (1991) is a young-adult novel by Lois Lowry. It is part of a series of books that Lowry wrote about Anastasia and her younger brother Sam.

Plot summary 
Just when her three best friends vow to give up boys, Anastasia Krupnik begins a secret correspondence with her ideal man, carefully selected from the personals column in her father's magazine. "SWM, 28, boyish charm, inherited wealth, looking for tall young woman, nonsmoker, to share Caribbean vacations, reruns of Casablanca, and romance." Sure, Anastasia is only thirteen, but a difference in age is a small obstacle when two people are on the same wavelength. And she, a tall, young movie buff who hates smoking, is certain that SWM (a.k.a. single white male) is on her wavelength. Heaven knows, she is definitely ready for romance.

When she actually receives a reply from her SWM, it is the start of another hilarious and ever original episode in the eventful life of our heroine extraordinaire, the outspoken, irresistible Anastasia Krupnik.

Review
"Anastasia herself is at her best here: headstrong, inventive, endearing, and irrepressible, though not above learning from her mistakes."—Publishers Weekly -

External links
 Description from Lowry's website.
Lowry's website
Complete list of books by Lowry

1991 American novels
American young adult novels
Novels by Lois Lowry